Eremobates socal is a species of windscorpion in the family Eremobatidae.

References

Solifugae
Articles created by Qbugbot
Animals described in 2004